Malus florentina is a species of apple known by the common names Florentine crabapple and hawthorn-leaf crabapple. It is native to the Balkan Peninsula and Italy, and it is grown elsewhere as an ornamental tree.

Description

It is cold hardy to UK zone 4 and the United States Department of Agriculture's zones 4–8, and is not frost tender. It blossoms in June, and the seeds ripen from October to November. Flowers appear in corymbs.

It ripens in mid autumn and usually blets on the tree.

Etymology 
The botanical name florentina and common name florentine refer to the municipality of Florence, Italy, which has a major history of botanical collection in their famous Renaissance gardens. The other common name hawthorn-leaf refers to its distinct toothed leaf shape, which closely resembles that of a hawthorn and is unusual for a crabapple.

Toxicity 
The seeds of all crabapples contain hydrogen cyanide, which can be toxic if consumed in large quantities.

Uses 
The fruit be eaten raw or cooked. When bletted, it has a mealy texture with a soft acid flesh, is refreshing in small quantities.

The species is suitable for cultivating in all kind of soils, with all levels of pH, but prefers moist or wet soil that is well drained. It prefers full sun but can also manage when semi-shaded.

References

External links

SCHEDA BOTANICA / PLANT PROFILE: Malus florentina (Zuccagni) C. K. Schneid.

florentina
Crabapples
Flora of Southeastern Europe